This is a list of episodes for the Japanese anime series Time Bokan. The anime was first aired in Japan on Fuji TV from October 4, 1975, to December 25, 1976. The series contains sixty-one episodes.

Episodes

Time Bokan